is an enclave district that belongs to Nerima, Tokyo, Japan, but is surrounded entirely by Saitama Prefecture.

Geography and Demographics
Nishiōizumimachi is surrounded by Katayama 3-chōme, Niiza, Saitama, Japan, approximately 60 meters north of Nishi-Ōizumi 6-chome. As of August 1, 2008, there are 6 households in this district and its population is 13, of which 6 are male and 7 are female. The area contains one small street running through the center; the entire area bears the number 1179, and individual houses are numbered 21, 23, and 25.

References

Neighborhoods of Tokyo
Nerima